Tresa Spaulding Hamson was an American basketball player for the BYU Cougars women's basketball team from 1983 to 1987. She was raised in Meridian, Idaho.

Her freshman year, she was named to the Women's Basketball Yearbook All-American honors first team and was a Street & Smith All-American honorable mention. As a sophomore, she was named First Team All-HCAC, Kodak Division I All-District VII, and American Women's Sports Federation fourth team All-America. Her junior year she was ranked third in the nation for points per game (25.2 average) and seventh in field goal percentage (.636). That same year she also earned HCAC Player of the Year honors and was named Kodak Division I All-District VII. Her senior year, she had the highest points per game in the nation, averaging 28.9, and was also second in the nation in field goal percentage (.652). She again earned the HCAC Player of the Year award, claimed her third straight Kodak Division I District VII award, and was named AWSF First Team All-America, with the designation of "Best Center in America".

During her collegiate career, she also participated as an alternate for the Team USA at the 1984 Olympics. After college, she played two seasons in Europe. In 1998, she was inducted into the BYU Hall of Fame.

Hamson earned two degrees from Brigham Young University: a bachelor's degree in youth leadership, and a master's degree in physical education. Her daughter Jennifer,  also played for BYU, starring in both basketball and volleyball.  Her son Alan, who stands , joined BYU's basketball team as a walk-on in 2015. Several brothers, sisters, and other family members of Hamson also played for BYU or other teams.

Hamson still holds many records at BYU, including the following:

USA Basketball
Spaulding played on the 1983 World University games team, coached by Jill Hutchison. She helped the team win the gold medal for the USA team.

Spaulding played for the USA World University Games team in Kobe, Japan in 1985. The team brought home a silver medal, after falling to the USSR. The team trailed by 18 points at one time, mounted a comeback attempt but fell short, losing 87–81. Spaulding averaged 1.0 point per game.

References

External links
 

Year of birth missing (living people)
Living people
American women's basketball players
BYU Cougars women's basketball players
People from Meridian, Idaho
Universiade gold medalists for the United States
Universiade medalists in basketball
Centers (basketball)
Medalists at the 1983 Summer Universiade
Medalists at the 1985 Summer Universiade